Geoffrey Strickland (born 17 June 1986) in the Cook Islands is a footballer who plays as a forward. He currently plays for Tupapa Maraerenga in the Cook Islands Round Cup and the Cook Islands national football team.

Club career
Strickland has played his whole career with Tupapa Maraerenga. However, in 2014, when he was trialing for the Cook Islands men's national team he suffered a serious hip injury which kept him away from playing for a long while. Strickland did not play any football until 2017. In 2018 he won the 2018 OFC Champions League Qualifying Stage with his club, which meant they qualified for the head-tournament in Vanuatu. In Group A they faced the Toti City Dwellers, Nalkutan and Ba. Tupapa lost their three group games and failed to qualify for the quarter-finals.

References

1986 births
Living people
Cook Islands international footballers
Association football forwards
Cook Island footballers